In differential geometry, a k-noid is a minimal surface with k catenoid openings. In particular, the 3-noid is often called trinoid. The first k-noid minimal surfaces were described by Jorge and Meeks in 1983.

The term k-noid and trinoid is also sometimes used for constant mean curvature surfaces, especially branched versions of the unduloid ("triunduloids").

k-noids are topologically equivalent to k-punctured spheres (spheres with k points removed). k-noids with symmetric openings can be generated using the Weierstrass–Enneper parameterization . This produces the explicit formula

 

 

 

It is also possible to create k-noids with openings in different directions and sizes, k-noids corresponding to the platonic solids and k-noids with handles.

References

External links
 Indiana.edu
 Page.mi.fu-berlin.de

Differential geometry
Minimal surfaces